Carphurini is a tribe of soft-wing flower beetles (beetles of the family Melyridae) in the subfamily Malachiinae.

Genera 
 Afrocarphurus
 Apteromalachius
 Balanophorus
 Brachyhedibius
 Carphuroides
 Carphuromorphus
 Carphurus
 Chaetocoelus
 Choresine
 Falsolaius
 Helcogaster
 Metachoresine
 Microcarphurus
 Neocarphurus
 Telocarphurus

References

External links 
 
 

Melyridae
Polyphaga tribes